Rustic is an unincorporated community in Larimer County, Colorado, United States. The community borders Glen Echo to the west.

In 1881, S.B. Stewart built the Rustic Hotel at this location.  It soon became a popular summer tourist resort.

The town of Rustic was established in 1882.

Climate

According to the Köppen Climate Classification system, Rustic has an oceanic climate, abbreviated "Cfb" on climate maps.

References

External links
Colorado Tourism Office page on Rustic

Unincorporated communities in Larimer County, Colorado
Unincorporated communities in Colorado